Carlos Martínez Ruiz (born 3 July 1997) is a Spanish professional footballer who plays for Terrassa FC as a forward.

Club career
Born in Barcelona, Catalonia, Martínez represented CE Mercantil, RCD Espanyol, FC Barcelona, CF Damm and UE Sant Andreu as a youth. He made his senior debut with the latter during the 2015–16 season in Tercera División, before moving to UE Llagostera's reserves in April 2016.

On 14 June 2017, Martínez joined Terrassa FC in the fourth tier, but was sparingly used. Roughly one year later, he returned to Sant Andreu on a one-year deal.

Martínez refused a contract renewal with the Quadribarrats in June 2019, and subsequently joined Girona FC, being assigned to the B-team in the regional leagues. He made his first team debut on 11 January 2020; coming on as a late substitute for Jordi Calavera, he scored his team's fourth in a 4–2 Copa del Rey away win against FC Cartagena.

Martínez's professional debut occurred on 23 January 2020, as he replaced Brandon in a 0–3 home loss against Villarreal CF, also for the national cup. On 13 October, after helping Girona B in their first-ever promotion to the fourth tier, he signed for another reserve team, CF Pobla de Mafumet also in division four.

References

External links

1997 births
Living people
Footballers from Barcelona
Spanish footballers
Association football forwards
Segunda Federación players
Tercera División players
Divisiones Regionales de Fútbol players
CF Damm players
UE Sant Andreu footballers
Terrassa FC footballers
Girona FC B players
Girona FC players
CF Pobla de Mafumet footballers